Jimmy Smet (31 October 1977 – 4 May 2012) was a Belgian football defender.

References

1977 births
2012 deaths
Belgian footballers
K.S.K. Beveren players
Iraklis Thessaloniki F.C. players
R.W.D. Molenbeek players
Lierse S.K. players
S.K. Beveren players
Belgian Pro League players
Super League Greece players
Association football defenders
Belgian expatriate footballers
Expatriate footballers in Greece
Belgian expatriate sportspeople in Greece